Corey Barnes (born 1 January 1992) is an English professional footballer who plays as a midfielder. He last played for Darlington in 2011.

Career
Born in Sunderland, Tyne and Wear, Barnes made his senior debut at the age of 16 for Darlington on 3 March 2009, against Notts County. Despite Barnes's youth, manager Dave Penney complimented him on his performance.

Barnes turned professional in the summer of 2010. In September 2010, he joined Whitby Town on a month's loan, where he played seven games in the Northern Premier League Premier Division. He was released by the club in June 2011.

Career statistics

References

1992 births
Living people
Footballers from Sunderland
English footballers
Association football midfielders
Darlington F.C. players
Whitby Town F.C. players
English Football League players
National League (English football) players
Northern Premier League players